Gnaphalostoma is a genus of moths belonging to the family Tortricidae.

Species
Gnaphalostoma nivacula Diakonoff, 1976

References

 , 1976, Zool. Verh. Leiden 144: 132.
 , 2005, World Catalogue of Insects volume 5 Tortricidae

External links
tortricidae.com

Chlidanotini
Tortricidae genera
Taxa named by Alexey Diakonoff